The Worcester Corset Company Factory is an historic factory building at 30 Wyman Street in Worcester, Massachusetts in the Main South neighborhood.  The oldest part of the factory was built in 1895, with expansion of the facilities taking place up to 1909.  The buildings were designed by Arthur F. Gray for the Worcester Corset Company, whose origins date to an 1861 business by David Hale Fanning making hoops for skirts, but shifted to manufacturing corsets after fashions changed.  Fanning's business was immensely successful, and he became one of Worcester's larger employers. At one point it employed over 2000 women.  After the Corset Company folded in 1940, the facility was used to manufacture military-style boots. The factory is now an apartment complex. 

The factory was listed on the National Register of Historic Places in 1984.

See also
Baystate Corset Block, NRHP-listed in Springfield, Massachusetts
Kraus Corset Factory, NRHP-listed in Derby, Connecticut
Strouse, Adler Company Corset Factory, NRHP-listed in New Haven, Connecticut
National Register of Historic Places listings in southwestern Worcester, Massachusetts

References

External links
Waist Cincher Corset

Industrial buildings and structures on the National Register of Historic Places in Massachusetts
Industrial buildings completed in 1895
Buildings and structures in Worcester, Massachusetts
National Register of Historic Places in Worcester, Massachusetts
Textile mills in the United States
Corsetry